Polythiazide is a thiazide diuretic. A diuretic is any substance that promotes the production of urine.

References 

Carbonic anhydrase inhibitors
Sulfonamides
Benzothiadiazines
Chloroarenes
Organofluorides
Trifluoromethyl compounds